The Beaulieu Mine was a post-World War II gold mining operation near Yellowknife, Northwest Territories. It entered production in October 1947 but by the end of November only 7 troy ounces (220 g) of rough gold were recovered. Additional gold was recovered during 1948, but the mine recovered only 30 troy ounces (930g) of fine gold altogether. The operation folded in chaos and bankruptcy.

References

External links
Yellowknife’s goldless gold mine

Gold mines in the Northwest Territories